Richard Henry Cardwell (August 1, 1845 – March 19, 1931) was an American politician and jurist. He was Speaker of the Virginia House of Delegates 1887–1895, and a justice of the state Supreme Court of Appeals 1895–1916.

Early life
Cardwell was born in Madison, North Carolina. His father, Richard Perrin Caldwell, died when he was an infant, and he had great difficulty in obtaining an education. As a youth, he attended public school and worked on the family farm in the summer and fall. He attended, for brief sessions, the Beulah Male Institute and the Madison Male Academy.

Career
In 1863, he became a private soldier in a North Carolina company of the Confederate Army and served until the end of the war. He then returned to his home but, in 1869, moved to Hanover County, Virginia, and, four years later, to Doswell, Virginia, where he lived for two years.  Because he was devoted to the study of law, he carried on his education by studying at night and, for a while, in the office of Samuel C. Redd.  He was admitted to the bar in 1874 and began practice in Richmond.

From 1881 to 1895, he was a member of the Virginia House of Delegates from Hanover County, serving as Speaker from 1887 onward. In 1894 he was elected to the Supreme Court of Appeals. He was made president of the court on June 12, 1916, but resigned on November 6, 1916.

Personal life
Cardwell died at his home, Prospect Hill, on March 19, 1931, and was interred at Woodlawn Cemetery in Ashland, Virginia. His son, William D. Cardwell, was Speaker of the House of Delegates from 1906 to 1908.

Notes and references

External links

1845 births
1931 deaths
Justices of the Supreme Court of Virginia
Speakers of the Virginia House of Delegates
Virginia lawyers
People from Hanover County, Virginia
People from Madison, North Carolina
People of North Carolina in the American Civil War
19th-century American politicians
19th-century American judges
20th-century American judges